Øre or Ørevatn is a lake in the municipality of Åseral in Agder county, Norway.  The  lake is located at the confluence of the rivers Logna and Monn at the village of Kyrkjebygda.  Near the southern end of the lake, the river Mandalselva flows southwards.  The village of Eikerapen lies along the southwestern shore of the lake.

See also
List of lakes in Norway

References

Åseral
Lakes of Agder